Skythrenchelys macrostoma, also known as the Large-mouth angry worm eel is a species of eel in the family Ophichthidae. It is a marine, tropical eel which is known from the Indo-Pacific Ocean, including Red Sea.

References

Fish described in 1864
Ophichthidae